Palazzo Editions is an independent publishing company based in Barnes, London, southern England. The company produces illustrated books covering the areas of architecture, art, biography, children's books, fantasy, popular culture, and history.

ISBNs for books published by Palazzo Editions start with 978-1786750.

References

External links 
 Palazzo Editions website

Book publishing companies of England
Visual arts publishing companies